The 2021 Liga de Balompié Mexicano season is the 2nd professional season of the most important league of competitions organized by the Asociación Nacional del Balompié Mexicano, a Mexican football federation affiliated with CONIFA. The season began on 21 August 2021.

Offseason Changes
 Eight teams will participate in the league.
 Halcones de Querétaro and Real Tlamazolan joined the league as expansion teams.
 Acaxees de Durango, Club Veracruzano de Fútbol Tiburón, Los Cabos and San José continued for another year on hiatus because they did not meet the requirement of having a stable project to resume activity.
 Leones Dorados and Morelos had dissolved due to financial issues. 
 Atlético Veracruz and Halcones de Zapopan left this league.

Teams

Stadiums and locations
{{Location map+ |Mexico |width=600|float=right |caption=Liga de Balompié Mexicano Official Teams |places=

Personnel and kits

Regular season

Standings

Positions by Round

Results 

Notes

Regular season statistics

Top goalscorers 
Players sorted first by goals scored, then by last name.

Hat tricks

Final stage

Semi-finals

First leg

Second leg

Final

First leg

Second leg

See also 
Liga de Balompié Mexicano

References

External links
 Official website of LBM 

Liga de Balompié Mexicano
1